San Karim (also Romanized as San Karīm; also known as San Karīm-e Bahādol) is a village in Seyyed Abbas Rural District, Shavur District, Shush County, Khuzestan Province, Iran. At the 2006 census, its population was 279, in 48 families.

References 

Populated places in Shush County